The Nieuport 27 (or Nieuport XXVII C.1 in contemporary sources) was a World War I French sesquiplane fighter aircraft designed by Gustave Delage. The 27 was the last of the line of Nieuport "V-strut" single seat fighters that began with the Nieuport 10 of 1914. Operational examples supplemented the very similar Nieuport 24 and 24bis in operational squadrons in late 1917 and many would also be used as advanced trainers.

Design and development
The Nieuport 27's design closely followed that of the 24, sharing the same faired fuselage, rounded ailerons and half-heart shaped rudder. 
The only externally visible changes from the 24 included the replacement of the fixed external wood Nieuport type sprung tailskid with an internally pivoted type, and the replacement of the single undercarriage axle that connected both wheels, with one that had a hinge along the centerline – and one extra wire.
By 1918, many Nieuport fighters were being used as advanced trainers, and the  Le Rhône 9JB Rotary engine was often replaced by lower powered engines, such as the  Le Rhône 9C.

Operational Nieuport 27s in Italian and French service were armed with a synchronized, fuselage-mounted  Vickers machine gun occasionally supplemented with an overwing Lewis Gun mounted on one of several mountings. In British service with the Royal Flying Corps and later the Royal Air Force a  Lewis Gun was mounted on a Foster mounting above the top wing.

Nieuport produced a number of prototypes either contemporary to, or based on the Nieuport 27, including one with a  Hispano-Suiza 8 V-8 inline engine that may have been designated the Nieuport 26, another with an enlarged 2 spar lower wing and a third with a redesigned front fuselage with a further simplified cabane structure, and a Vickers mounted on the forward port longeron. Development of the Nieuport 28, with ailerons moved to the two spar lower wing, rounded wingtips and a simplified fuselage structure, concluded further development of the 27 line.

Operational history

Despite being obsolescent before entering service, the type served with a large number of French Aéronautique Militaire units, pending availability of the newer SPAD S.XIII.

In protest of the humiliation of airmen being ordered to march rather than fly for the main French victory parade on the Champs Élysées to celebrate the end of the First World War, Charles Godefroy flew a Nieuport 27 through the  gap between the pillars of the Arc de Triomphe, three weeks after the official victory parade, on 7 August 1919, an act which was widely reported in contemporary newspapers.

All Italian Nieuport 27s were imported from France. About 200 Nieuport 27s were supplied to Italy as Nieuport-Macchi was already at capacity producing the Hanriot HD.1 under licence.

The British Royal Flying Corps obtained 71 Nieuport 27s in 1917, supplementing or replacing earlier Nieuports. These were used until early 1918 when Royal Aircraft Factory S.E.5As became available in sufficient numbers, with the final operational examples being used in Palestine, while others were used in secondary roles, in the UK for training and trials.

In 1918 the United States Army Air Service placed orders for 461 Nieuport 27 E.Is for use as advanced fighter-trainers, of which 287 were delivered.

The Japanese bought several pattern aircraft and from 1921 to 1923 built 102 aircraft, with production starting by the Army Supply Depot at Tokorozawa until taken over by the Nakajima Aircraft Company. These were later designated as the 甲 3 (Ko 3), however the Japanese did not distinguish between the 24 and the 27.

The Uruguayan Air Service (Escuela Militar de Aviación (EMA)) purchased 6 surplus Nieuport 27s from France before EMA built an additional 18 unlicensed copies. In 1930 these were redesignated as AIME 10 (Avión de Instrucción Modelo Escuela – Training aircraft school model 10). The last of these were only retired in 1931.

After being retired from military service, a number of Nieuport 27s found their way onto the civil aircraft registers, particularly in France and Japan.

Operators
 
Bulgarian Air Force – One captured Nieuport 27, formerly N5346
 

Aéronautique Militaire
Army Cooperation 
Escadrille N12
Escadrille N76
Escadrille N79
Escadrille N82
Escadrille N87
Escadrille N88
Escadrille N90
Escadrille N91
Escadrille N92
Escadrille N94
Escadrille N95
Escadrille N96
Escadrille N97
Escadrille N98
Escadrille N99
Escadrille N102
Escadrille N151
Escadrille N152
Escadrille N155
Escadrille N156
Escadrille N157
Escadrille N158
Escadrille N159
Escadrille N160
Escadrille N161
Escadrille N162
Escadrille N313
Escadrille N314
Escadrille N315
Escadrille N392
Escadrille N523
Escadrille N531
Escadrille N562
Escadrille N581
Group de Combat 11
Escadrille N57
Group de Combat 14
Escadrille N86
Group de Combat 17
Escadrille N89
Escadrille N91
Escadrille N100
Group de Combat 20
Escadrille N68
Escadrille N99
Escadrille N159
Escadrille N162
Group de Combat 21
Escadrille N98
Escadrille N157

Hellenic Air Force 
 

Corpo Aeronautico Militare
72a Squadriglia 
73a Squadriglia
74a Squadriglia
75a Squadriglia
79a Squadriglia
81a Squadriglia
83a Squadriglia
91a Squadriglia
108a Squadriglia
5a Sezione Difesa di Padova
 
Imperial Japanese Army Air Service – 102 built under licence by Nakajima as the Ko 3.
 / 
Imperial Russian Air Service
Soviet Air Force – Taken over from the Imperial Russian Air Force.

Aéronautique Serbe operated 3 Nieuport 27s.
 Siam 
Royal Siamese Aeronautical Service

Turkish Air Force – operated one captured Greek aircraft, named Ganimet 4 (war booty 4), and they may have captured a second example.
 

Royal Flying Corps

No. 1 Squadron RFC
No. 14 Squadron RFC
No. 17 Squadron RFC
No. 29 Squadron RFC
No. 40 Squadron RFC
No. 60 Squadron RFC
No. 67 Squadron RFC
No. 111 Squadron RFC
No. 113 Squadron RFC
Royal Air Force
No. 22 Squadron RAF
No. 29 Squadron RAF
 
United States Army Air Service
American Expeditionary Force 
31st Aero Squadron
37th Aero Squadron

Uruguayan Air Force operated 24 examples until 1931.

Specifications

References

Notes

Bibliography

.

External links

1910s French fighter aircraft
Military aircraft of World War I
 027
Sesquiplanes
Aircraft first flown in 1917
Single-engined tractor aircraft
Rotary-engined aircraft
1910s French military trainer aircraft